Frank Alexander French (1893–1969) was an American professional baseball outfielder with the Philadelphia Athletics during the  season. He was born in Dover, New Hampshire and is buried in Bath, Maine.

He attended the University of Maine, where he played college baseball for the Black Bears in the 1910s.

References

External links

Major League Baseball outfielders
Philadelphia Athletics players
People from Dover, New Hampshire
People from Bath, Maine
Maine Black Bears baseball players
Baseball players from New Hampshire
Baseball players from Maine
1893 births
1969 deaths
Burials in Maine
Portland Eskimos players
Sportspeople from Strafford County, New Hampshire